Go to Hell is a 7-inch EP by Polish death metal band Vader, containing two tracks from Tibi et Igni. The song "Where Angels Weep" was also released digitally. Both were released on April 18, 2014, through Nuclear Blast. There is a slight difference in mixing between Go to Hell and Tibi et Igni: the second guitar solo in "Where Angels Weep" was performed by Marek "Spider" Pająk, while on the album all guitars were performed by Piotr "Peter" Wiwczarek.

The song "Where Angels Weep" is based on conflict between good and evil, while the lyrics for "Triumph of Death" were inspired by Pieter Bruegel the Elder's painting The Triumph of Death (1562).

Track listing

Personnel

Vader
Piotr "Peter" Wiwczarek – vocals, guitars
Marek "Spider" Pająk – guitars
Tomasz "Hal" Halicki – bass guitar
James Stewart – drums

Production
Wojtek and Sławek Wiesławscy – production, mixing, mastering, recording (at Hertz Recording Studio, Białystok, Poland, December 2013 – February 2014)
Piotr Polak – sound engineering assistance
Mariusz Kmiołek – management

Release history

Notes

References

2014 EPs
Vader (band) albums
Nuclear Blast albums